Aukett Swanke is a firm of architects based in London.

History
The firm was founded as an architectural and interior design partnership by Michael Aukett in 1972. It acquired Fitzroy Robinson & Partners in 2005 to become Aukett Fitzroy Robinson and then acquired the European arm of Swanke Hayden Connell to form Aukett Swanke in December 2013.

References

External links
Official site

British companies established in 1972
Architecture firms based in London
Companies listed on the London Stock Exchange
Companies listed on the Alternative Investment Market